Andrus Poksi (born 8 August 1968) is an Estonian sailing coach and sport personnel.

He was born in Tartu. In 1993 he graduated from the University of Tartu's Institute of Physical Education in physiotherapy speciality.

1981-1990 he exercised sailing, coached by Valdeko Säre. 1989-1994 he exercised basketball, coached by Arne Laos.

He has been a sailing coach (since 2006 international category). 2012-2013 he was the president of Estonian Yachting Union. Since 2010 he is the commodore of Tallinn Yachting Club.

References

Living people
1968 births
Estonian male sailors (sport)
Estonian sports coaches
University of Tartu alumni
Sportspeople from Tartu